Leopold Macaulay (November 25, 1887 – December 24, 1979) was a Canadian politician and lawyer, born in Peterborough, Ontario.

Macaulay was a Conservative member of the Legislative Assembly of Ontario. He was first elected as Member of the Legislative Assembly (MLA) for the Toronto area riding of York South in 1926. He was brought into the cabinet as Provincial Secretary and Registrar in September 1930 in the last few weeks of the administration of Ontario Premier George Howard Ferguson. He was retained in that position when Ferguson's successor, George Henry formed his cabinet in December.

Macaulay went on to serve as Minister of Highways from 1931 to 1934 and also Minister of Public Works for six months before the defeat of the Henry government by Mitchell Hepburn's Ontario Liberal Party in the 1934 Ontario election.

Macaulay kept his seat through the election and, in 1936, he was a candidate in the Ontario Conservative leadership convention placing fourth. He remained in the legislature until losing his seat in the 1943 Ontario election to Ontario Co-operative Commonwealth Federation leader Ted Jolliffe.

He also served on the Board of Regents of Victoria University, University of Toronto from 1932 to 1972, serving as chair from 1942 to 1951.

References

External links 

1887 births
1979 deaths
Members of the Executive Council of Ontario
People from Peterborough, Ontario
Progressive Conservative Party of Ontario MPPs
Provincial Secretaries of Ontario
University of Toronto people